Theo Klöckner (born 19 October 1934) is a German former footballer who played as a winger for VfB Speldorf, Schwarz-Weiß Essen and Werder Bremen. He made two appearances for the West Germany national team.

He is a trained electrician. After his footballing career, he managed a gas station.

Honours
Schwarz-Weiß Essen
 DFB-Pokal: 1959

Werder Bremen
 Bundesliga: 1964–65

References

External links
 

1934 births
Living people
German footballers
Association football forwards
Germany international footballers
SV Werder Bremen players
Bundesliga players
Schwarz-Weiß Essen players